The Equity Ensemble Awards (or Equity Awards) are an Australian awards system, that is an accolade presented by The Equity Foundation, the performers branch of the Media, Entertainment and Arts Alliance (MEAA). The awards have been presented annually since 2011, and are awarded to a cast in a television drama series, comedy series and television movie or miniseries. The awards are peer voted, via a secret ballot, by members of the Equity Foundation. In addition to these categories, the foundation also presents a lifetime achievement award, which has been presented since 2009.

Award categories

Competitive

Most Outstanding Performance by an Ensemble in a Comedy Series
In the following list, winners are listed first and highlighted in a separate colour, in boldface; those not highlighted or in boldface are the nominees. The years listed are of when the television program first aired in Australia; the awards are presented the year after.

Most Outstanding Performance by an Ensemble in a Drama Series
In the following list, winners are listed first and highlighted in a separate colour, in boldface; those not highlighted or in boldface are the nominees. The years listed are of when the television program first aired in Australia; the awards are presented the year after.

Most Outstanding Performance by an Ensemble in a Television Movie or Miniseries
In the following list, winners are listed first and highlighted in a separate colour, in boldface; those not highlighted or in boldface are the nominees. The years listed are of when the television program first aired in Australia; the awards are presented the year after.

Lifetime Achievement Award
2009: Peter Carroll
2010: Bob Hornery
2011: Maggie Dence
2012: Ron Haddrick
2013: Jill Perryman and Kevan Johnston
2014: Toni Lamond
2015: Grant Page
2016: Anne Phelan
2017: Noeline Brown
2018: Julia Blake and Terry Norris
2019: Lillian Crombie and Ningali Lawford-Wolf

See also
 List of television awards
 Media, Entertainment and Arts Alliance

References

External links
 Official Equity Awards website
 2014 winners and nominees
 2014 nominees - full list

Media coverage
 If.com.au 2011 Awards article
 TV Tonight 2013 Awards article
 TV Tonight 2014 Awards article

Australian television awards
Awards established in 2011
Television awards for best cast
2011 establishments in Australia